Ireneo della Croce (1625 – 1713) was a Carmelite preacher and chronicler. Croce was born in Trieste. He lived in the monasteries of Venice and Padova, but visited his hometown frequently. His magnum opus (Historia antica e moderna, sacra e profana ... della città di Trieste ... fin'a quest'anno 1698) was printed in Venice with funds from the Trieste Comune and some private citizens. In spite of its title, the book stopped in the year 1000. A second part, which chronicled Trieste up to 1702, was published in 1881. Ireneo della Croce died in Venice in 1713.

A street in Trieste was dedicated to him.

References

External links
 Free version of della Croce's Historia Antica, e Moderna: Sacra, e Profana, della città di Trieste, celebre colonia de'Cittadini Romani. Con la notitia di molt'arcani d'antichità, prerogative di nobiltà e gesti d'huomini illustri ... mutationi de riti, e dominj sin'à quest'anno 1698, etc

1625 births
1713 deaths
Religious leaders from Trieste
Italian chroniclers
17th-century Italian writers
17th-century Italian historians